Todd Jones (born 1968) is an American baseball pitcher.

Todd Jones may also refer to: 

 William Todd-Jones (born 1958), British puppet designer and film performer
 B. Todd Jones (born 1957), American lawyer and ATF director
 Todd Jones (politician) (born 1967), American politician
 Todd Jones (American football) (born 1967), NFL player
 Todd Jones, frontman of the hardcore punk band Nails